Thalassia  may refer to:

Thalassia, Greece, a village in northern Greece
Thalassia (plant), a genus of seagrass commonly known as "turtle grass"
Thalassia (queen), a queen of Characene

See also
Thalassa (disambiguation)